Adisak Srikampang (born January 14, 1985), simply known as Ae, is a Thai retired professional footballer who played as a forward.

Personal life
Adisak's brother Sila Srikampang is also a footballer and plays as a right back.

References
 
https://web.archive.org/web/20161002155633/http://www.fourfourtwo.com/th/features/ekngelk-7-sudydaekhngfrmepriiyngliikwan-aetaimpraangkabaithyliik?page=0%2C4
http://www.smmsport.com/reader.php?news=184414
https://th.soccerway.com/players/adisak-srikumpang/334136/

1985 births
Living people
Adisak Srikampang
Adisak Srikampang
Association football forwards
Adisak Srikampang
Adisak Srikampang
Adisak Srikampang
Thai expatriate footballers
Adisak Srikampang